Makri (Nissos Makri) is a Greek island, one of the Echinades, in the Ionian Islands group. It is located on the far southeast side of the Gulf of Makri close to the mouth of the Acheloos river. , it had no resident population. Strabo, and most modern writers, identify Dulichium, from which Homer reports that Meges, son of Phyleus, led 40 ships to Troy, with the island of Makri.

Made up of 2 hills linked by an isthmus, there is also a small islet at its southeastern corner.

The island is privately owned.

References

External links
Makri on GTP Travel Pages (in English and Greek)

Islands of Greece
Echinades
Trojan War
Islands of the Ionian Islands (region)
Landforms of Ithaca
Private islands of Greece